"Naked" is a song by English singer, songwriter and media personality Louise, released on 27 May 1996 as the third single from her debut solo album of the same name (1996). It charted at number five in the United Kingdom and was certified platinum. "Naked" also was a top-20 hit in Iceland and Ireland. A music video was produced to promote the single, directed by Gregg Masuak.

Critical reception
Jon O'Brien from AllMusic noted that "modeling itself on Janet Jackson's Rhythm Nation era, the breathless vocals, funky R&B rhythms, and risqué video of "Naked" catapulted Louise into the Top Five for the first time." Can't Stop the Pop described it as a "slick pop anthem; the delivery snaps and gets right to the point". They added that "it’s a performance quite unlike any that Louise had delivered before, but one which suits her immensely. The pacing is perfect, with each line rolling fluidly off her tongue. The chorus remains similarly tight, while also allowing Louise some room to purr her way through it sensually". 

Pan-European magazine Music & Media wrote that it is "a charming pop/dance record with a simply irresistible hook, which makes it easy to programme for a multitude of formats." A reviewer from Music Week rated it three out of five, noting that "more poppy than previous releases, this should see the former Eternal member in the Top 20 once more." In his review of the album, Mark Sutherland from NME stated that "nothing else quite touches the majesty of 'Naked'".

Track listings

 UK CD1
 "Naked" (radio mix)
 "Naked" (Garden of Eden vocal)
 "Naked" (Imagination vocal)
 "Naked" (Kamasutra vocal mix)
 "Naked" (Imagination dub)
 "Naked" (Boot 'n' Mac club mix)

 UK CD2
 "Naked" (radio mix)
 "Keep the Lovin' In"
 "Do Me Right"
 "Light of My Life"

 UK 12-inch single
A1. "Naked" (Garden of Eden vocal)
A2. "Naked" (Imagination vocal)
B1. "Naked" (Kamasutra vocal mix)
B2. "Naked" (Imagination dub)

 Australian CD single
 "Naked" (radio mix)
 "Keep the Lovin' In"
 "Naked" (Kamasutra vocal mix)
 "Naked" (Imagination vocal mix)

Charts and certifications

Weekly charts

Year-end charts

Certifications

References

1996 songs
1996 singles
Louise Redknapp songs
EMI Records singles
First Avenue Records singles
Songs written by Denis Ingoldsby
Songs written by Trevor Steel